Koch is a crater on the far side of the Moon. It lies in the southern hemisphere, to the south-southeast of the walled plain Jules Verne. Attached to the northeastern rim of Koch by a neck of uneven terrain is the crater Lundmark. Less than one crater diameter to the south of Koch is Crocco.

This crater has a worn and eroded outer rim. Several small craters lie along the outer rim, particularly along the northern edge. Attached to the western side is the satellite crater Koch U. The interior floor is also marked by some small craters, with a pair located just to the north of the midpoint and another along the southern inner wall.

Satellite craters
By convention these features are identified on lunar maps by placing the letter on the side of the crater midpoint that is closest to Koch.

References

 
 
 
 
 
 
 
 
 
 
 
 

Impact craters on the Moon